This is a list of straw polls that have been conducted relating to the 2012 Republican Party presidential primaries.

Total Straw Poll Victories (Updated March 20, 2012)

Total Straw Poll Victories is as follows:

Straw Poll Victories After Voting Started (Updated March 20, 2012)

The number of Straw Poll victories after voting started is as follows:

Straw polls taken before voting started

January 22, 2011, Derry, New Hampshire – New Hampshire Straw Poll

Results from the 2011 New Hampshire Straw Poll were as follows:

February 10–12, 2011, Washington, D.C. – CPAC Straw Poll

Results from the 2011 CPAC Straw Poll were as follows:

February 27, 2011, Phoenix, Arizona – Tea Party Straw Polls

Results from the 2011 Tea Party Straw Poll were as follows:

Onsite Poll

Online Poll

Combined Polls

March 6, 2011, Seaside, Oregon – Dorchester Conference Straw Poll

Results from the 2011 Dorchester Conference Straw Poll were as follows:

March 15, 2011, Washington, D.C. – National League of Cities Straw Poll

Results from the 2011 National League of Cities Straw Poll were as follows:

The "50 or so votes" referenced in all articles on this ballot can only mean that there were either 32 or 64 votes given the percentages above (i.e. 3% of the vote is either 1 vote or 2 votes). Human estimation tendencies would lean towards the real answer being 64 votes.

March 20, 2011, Sacramento, California – Republican Liberty Caucus of California Presidential Straw Poll

Republican Liberty Caucus straw poll at the 2011 California Republican convention:

Finishing with less than ten votes were, in order, John R. Bolton (8), Gary Johnson (7), Herman Cain (5), Haley Barbour (4), Rick Santorum (4), Jon Huntsman, Jr. (3), Donald Trump (3), Chris Christie (2), Jim DeMint (2), Marco Rubio (2), Scott Walker (2), Paul Ryan (1), Colin Powell (1), Allen West (1), Tom McClintock (1), Dana Perino (1), and None of the Above (1).

March 31, 2011, Goffstown, New Hampshire - St. Anselm College Republicans Straw Poll

Karger wins St. Anselm straw poll

April 3, 2011, York County, South Carolina - South Carolina Straw Poll

South Carolina straw poll as part of the Grassroots SC campaign:

Also appearing on the ballot but failing to get more than 5% were, in alphabetical order, Haley Barbour, John R. Bolton, Herman Cain, Mitch Daniels, Jon Huntsman, Jr., Gary Johnson, Sarah Palin, Ron Paul and Rick Santorum.

April 15, 2011, Charleston County - Republican Party Straw Poll

Source of results: CNN

April 16, 2011, Georgia's 3rd congressional district - Georgia 3rd District Convention Straw Poll

Georgia straw poll as part of the 3rd District Republican convention:

May 5–6, 2011, Columbia, South Carolina – South Carolina Republican Party Convention presidential straw poll

May 6, 2011, Washington state – Washington GOP 29th Annual Spring Gala straw poll

May 15, 2011, Kauai County, Hawaii – Hawaii GOP Presidential straw poll

  Arithmetic shows 59 votes were canvassed in the straw poll (all rounded-percentages above are multiples of 1.69%).

June 16–18, 2011, New Orleans, Louisiana – Republican Leadership Conference Straw Poll
Source of results: Republican Leadership Conference

June 19, 2011, Clay County, Iowa - Republican Party Straw Poll

July 22, 2011, Ohio Republican Party - Ohio Republican Party Presidential Straw Poll
Source of results: Politico

July 31, 2011, Denver, Colorado - Western Conservative Summit
Source of results:

August 4, 2011, Harrington, Delaware - Delaware State Fair GOP Straw Poll
Source of results:

August 13, 2011, Hilton Coliseum, Ames, Iowa - Iowa Straw Poll

Source of results: Washington Examiner and National Journal

 The day after the poll, on August 14, Tim Pawlenty announced his withdrawal from the race after his third-place finish.

 Rick Perry, who was not on the poll ballot and only appeared as a write-in candidate, formally announced his candidacy while in South Carolina on the same day that the poll took place.

 In June, two months before the poll, presidential candidate Mitt Romney, who had won the 2007 Ames Straw Poll, announced that he would skip the 2011 Ames Straw Poll.

August 15, 2011, Milwaukee, Wisconsin - Wisconsin State Fair straw poll

Source of results:

August 20, 2011, New Hampshire - New Hampshire Young Republicans Straw Poll

Source of results: Hampton-NorthHamptonPatch

August 27, 2011, Georgia - Georgia State GOP Straw Poll

Source of results: Politico

September 9, 2011, Maryland - Maryland GOP Straw Poll

Source of results: Republican Party of Maryland

September 12, 2011 Cincinnati Tea Party Straw Poll
A straw poll was held at the September 12 Republican debate, to find out who the debate audience thought were the front runners, both before and after the debate. Before the debate, Ron Paul came first, Rick Perry came second, and Michele Bachmann came third. After the debate, Ron Paul was still first, Michele Bachmann came second, and Herman Cain came third. CNN have not released the full results of this poll, instead holding an online poll which omitted Ron Paul from the choices. The winner of the online poll was Mitt Romney.

Pre-Debate Poll

Post-Debate Poll

September 16, 2011 Harrisburg, Pennsylvania straw poll
Former senator Rick Santorum won first place in a straw poll among Pennsylvania Republicans, winning 36% of the vote. Governor Mitt Romney won 25%, and Governor Rick Perry won 18%.

September 17 California GOP Straw Poll

The California Republican Party held a straw poll in mid-September 2011, which was won by Ron Paul. The full results were:

Source of results: Politico

September 24 Florida GOP Presidency 5 Straw Poll

The Florida Republican Party held a straw poll at the end of September 2011, which was won by Herman Cain. Political analysts attributed Cain's win to Perry's poor debate performances, but others pointed to the fact that Cain won the Florida straw poll after campaigning in-person throughout the state more than Perry.

The full results were:

Source of results:

September 23–25, 2011, Michigan Republican Party Mackinac Republican Leadership Conference Straw Poll

Source of results:

October 1, 2011, National Federation of Republican Women Straw Poll

Source of results:

October 1, 2011, TeaCon Midwest Straw Poll

Source of results:

The vote for Obama was attributed to a vote by one of the media members present for the event by the announcer.

October 3–9, 2011, South Carolina - Orangeburg County Fair Straw Poll 

Source of results:

October 7–9, 2011, Washington, D.C. – Values Voter Straw Poll 
Source of results:

October 8, 2011, Saint Paul, Minnesota - Republican Midwest Leadership Conference Straw Poll
Source of results:

October 13, 2011, Los Angeles County, California - RPLAC Straw Poll

October 15, 2011, Columbia, South Carolina - Tea Party Straw Poll 
Source of results:

Note: the percentages only add to 83.5% because results for 3 contenders (likely Ron Paul, Rick Santorum and Gary Johnson) are unknown, but they polled somewhere in between Romney and Bachmann.

October 15, 2011, Bismarck, North Dakota - Tea Party Straw Poll 
Source of results:

October 18, 2011, Charleston, South Carolina - Charleston County Republican Party 
Source of results:

October 18, 2011, Mississippi College Straw poll 
Source of results:

October 21, 2011, Las Vegas, Nevada - Nevada GOP Straw Poll
Source of results:

October 22, 2011, Columbus, Ohio - Ohio GOP Swing State Straw Poll
Source of results:

October 25, 2011, Anderson County, Tennessee - East Tennessee GOP straw poll
Source of results:

October 29, 2011, Des Moines, Iowa - National Federation of Republican Assemblies Presidential Straw Poll 

Source of results:

Tally 1 (Iowa voters only):

Tally 2 (non-Iowa voters)

October 29, 2011, Tuscaloosa, Alabama - West Alabama Straw Poll
Source of results:

November 5, 2011, Illinois - Illinois Straw Poll
Source of results:

November 5, 2011, Sioux Falls, South Dakota - South Dakota Straw Poll
Source of results:

According to KSFY/ABC "dozens" of people participated in this straw poll. No definitive number was given.

November 14, 2011, North Charleston, South Carolina - Charleston County Republican Party Straw Poll
Source of results:

November 14, 2011, San Diego, California - San Diego GOP Straw poll 
Source of results:

November 19, 2011, Springfield, Missouri - Missouri Tea Party Straw poll 
Source of results:

November 19, 2011, North Carolina - North Carolina Republican straw poll 
Source of results:

November 19, 2011, Rockford, Illinois - Winnebago County GOP straw poll 
Source of results:

December 1, 2011, Dubuque, Iowa - Dubuque Tea Party straw poll 
Source of results:

Note: This was an unusual straw poll in which voter's preferences were matched against each other for five rounds, with the less popular candidate being removed at each stage. There were initially 6 available choices, which were whittled down to two, with the final result being as shown above.

December 5, 2011, Oklahoma City, Oklahoma - Oklahoma GOP straw poll 
Source of results:

December 8, 2011, Chattanooga, Tennessee - Hamilton County Young Republican straw poll 
Source of results:

December 10, 2011, Des Moines, IA – Drake University Straw Poll

Results from the 2011 Drake University Straw Poll were as follows:

The poll was distributed to Drake students via email to coincide with the December 10 Republican presidential debate, held on campus.

December 13, 2011, Pasco County, Florida – Pasco County GOP straw poll

Results:

December 13, 2011, Cedar Valley, Iowa – Cedar Falls Tea Party Straw Poll

Results:

Straw polls taken after voting started

January 2–4, 2012, Online - Idaho Straw Poll

Results:

January 6, 2012, Boise, Idaho – Idaho Republican Party Presidential Straw Poll

Results:

Note: Rick Perry's campaign asked not to be included on Straw Poll Ballot.

January 14, 2012: Saddle Up Texas straw poll 

Results:

Paper ballots:

Text message voting:

January 20, 2012: Connecticut GOP straw poll 

Results:

January 28, 2012, Arizona Republican Party Presidential Straw Poll

Results:

February 2–4, 2012, Online – Idaho Straw Poll II

Results:

February 10–12, 2012, Washington, D.C. – CPAC Straw Poll

Results:

February 18, 2012, Coweta County Republican Presidential Straw Poll

Results:

March 1–3, 2012, Online - Idaho Straw Poll III

Results:

Candidate Totals

Zip Code Totals

City Totals

See also
 Republican Party (United States) presidential primaries, 2012
Statewide opinion polling for the Republican Party (United States) presidential primaries, 2012
 Nationwide opinion polling for the United States presidential election, 2012
Nationwide opinion polling for the Republican Party 2012 presidential primaries
Statewide opinion polling for the United States presidential election, 2012

External links
Republican Primary 17-poll average  from The Wall Street Journal

References

Straw polls